University College of Engineering and Technology may refer to:

 University College of Engineering and Technology, Bahawalpur, Punjab, Pakistan
 University College of Engineering and Technology, Bikaner, Rajasthan, India

See also
 University College of Engineering (disambiguation)